Cranky may refer to:

 Irritability
 Cranky Kong, a character from the Donkey Kong video game series
 Cranky the Crane, a character from the children's television series Thomas & Friends
 Cranky Doodle Donkey, a character in the Canadian animated TV series My Little Pony: Friendship is Magic
 Mr. Cranky, a satirical film critic personae since 1995
 Cranky, a character from Where's My Water?

See also
 Crank (disambiguation)
 Kranky (disambiguation)
 Crankie, a form of moving panorama performance operated by a crank